Veradigm (formerly Allscripts Healthcare Solutions, Inc.) is a publicly traded American company that provides physician practices, hospitals, and other healthcare providers with practice management and electronic health record technology. Veradigm also provides products for patient engagement and care coordination, as well as financial and analytics technology. The company has more than 180,000 physician users and has products in 2,700 hospitals and 13,000 extended care organizations.The company formerly changed its name from Allscripts to Veradigm in January 2023.

History 
Allscripts was founded in 1981 and is headquartered in Chicago, Illinois. An additional key operations' office is located in Raleigh, North Carolina.

In 2008, Allscripts merged with the healthcare systems operations of its rival, Misys. In 2010, Allscripts-Misys merged with another healthcare information technology competitor, Eclipsys, in a $1.3 billion deal, merging patient records, to create the industry’s largest network of clients.

In 2020 Allscripts executed two major divestment moves. In October, Allscripts sold its EPSi business, a provider of financial decision support and planning tools for hospitals and health systems, to Strata Decision Technology for $365 million.  Later, in December 2020, Allscripts closed the sale of its care coordination business, CarePort Health, to Wellsky for $1.35 billion.

Acquisitions
In March 2013, Allscripts acquired dbMotion, Ltd., a developer of system interfaces and data analytics tools, and Jardogs LLC, a developer of a personal health record.

In 2018 Allscripts acquired Practice Fusion.

In 2019, Allscripts acquired ZappRx, a Boston-based prescription drug startup, which provides an online platform used by patients, physicians, and pharmacists for the management of specialty medications.

Legal issues 
In December 2012, four physician practices brought a class-action suit against Allscripts due to selling the "buggy" MyWay EHR and later discontinuing it. It was believed to be a first-of-its-kind case. The parties reached a joint settlement agreement that received final approval from the trial court judge. With this first lawsuit of this nature it has become a reference for future cases in this industry.

In 2015 Allscripts was set to pay nearly $9.75 million to the proposed class to settle claims of securities fraud, after the company allegedly overstated its ability to integrate its Microsoft .NET and SQL Server with those of Eclipsys following their $1.3 billion merger.

In 2019, one year after Allscripts’ acquisition of Practice Fusion, a San Francisco-based electronic health records company intended to expand Allscripts' business with independent physicians, Allscripts agreed to settle with the Department of Justice over "potential issues with the EHR vendor’s health IT certification and Practice Fusion’s compliance with the Anti-Kickback Statute and HIPAA." As part of the settlement, Practice Fusion paid $145 million dollars.

In 2020, the Department of Justice detailed the $145 million settlement in a press release:

Allscripts chief administrative officer Brian Farley said that Practice Fusion's behavior was known to Allscripts prior to the purchase. Farley also noted that Allscripts was working to help combat the opioid epidemic.

Ransomware attack 
On January 18, 2018, Allscripts was hit with a ransomware attack. This caused a massive outage which lasted nearly a week and affected clients all over the globe. The attack was a new strain of a known bug, SamSam. Since then, clients have filed a class action lawsuit alleging Allscripts should have taken better steps to protect their data.

References

External links
 Allscripts.com

Companies based in Chicago
Software companies based in Illinois
Health care companies based in Illinois
Companies listed on the Nasdaq
Electronic health record software companies
1999 initial public offerings
Software companies of the United States